The electoral division of Montgomery is one of the fifteen electorates in the Tasmanian Legislative Council.

It is centred on the Central Coast area and includes the localities of; Ulverstone, Penguin, Heybridge, Hampshire and West Pine.

The electorate also includes most of the City of Burnie. Acton, Hillcrest, Montello, Brooklyn, Romaine, South Burnie and Upper Burnie are part of this electoral division. However Somerset, Parklands, Park grove and Shorewell are located in the Electoral division of Murchison. The division shares its western borders with the Burnie Municipal Council.

, Montgomery had 27,913 enrolled voters and covers an area of 2,457 km². The electorate is represented by Leonie Hiscutt, who was elected at the last election held in 2013. The most recent periodic election was held on 4 May 2019.

Members

See also

 Tasmanian House of Assembly

References

External links
Parliament of Tasmania
Tasmanian Electoral Commission - Legislative Council

Electoral divisions of Tasmania
North West Tasmania